Max Boyes (6 May 1934 – 2 May 2022) was a British hurdler. He competed in the men's 400 metres hurdles at the 1960 Summer Olympics.

References

External links
 

1934 births
2022 deaths
Athletes (track and field) at the 1960 Summer Olympics
British male hurdlers
Olympic athletes of Great Britain
Sportspeople from Lincoln, England